The Embassy of Myanmar in Washington, D.C. is the diplomatic mission of the  Republic of the Union of Myanmar to the United States. The embassy is located at 2300 S Street NW, Washington, D.C., in the Kalorama neighborhood.  The building is a 1905 former residence designed by noted architect Appleton P. Clark, Jr., and was the home of President Herbert Hoover before and after his presidency. The ambassadorial residence is in the Charles Evans Hughes House on R Street.

The current ambassador of Myanmar to the United States is Aung Lynn.

See also
 Foreign relations of Burma
 List of Washington, D.C. embassies

References

External links
 
Official website

Washington, D.C.
Myanmar
Myanmar–United States relations